Eocene Peak is a granitic summit with an elevation of  located on the crest of the Sierra Nevada mountain range, in northern California, United States. The summit is situated on the common boundary shared by Yosemite National Park with Hoover Wilderness, as well as the common border of Mono County and Tuolumne County. The peak is set approximately three miles southwest of Twin Lakes, 1.3 mile southeast of Kettle Peak, and one mile south of The Incredible Hulk. The nearest town is Bridgeport, 15 miles to the northeast. The first ascent of the summit was made July 16, 1932, by Richard M. Leonard and Herbert B. Blanks. This landform's name has not been officially adopted by the U.S. Board on Geographic Names, so the feature is not labeled on USGS maps.

Climate
According to the Köppen climate classification system, Eocene Peak is located in an alpine climate zone. Most weather fronts originate in the Pacific Ocean, and travel east toward the Sierra Nevada mountains. As fronts approach, they are forced upward by the peaks (orographic lift), causing moisture in the form of rain or snowfall to drop onto the range. Precipitation runoff from this landform drains north into Blacksmith Creek which is part of the Walker River drainage basin, and south into Piute Creek which is a tributary of the Tuolumne River.

See also
 
 Geology of the Yosemite area
 Tuolumne Intrusive Suite

References

Mountains of Mono County, California
Mountains of Tuolumne County, California
North American 3000 m summits
Mountains of Northern California
Sierra Nevada (United States)
Humboldt–Toiyabe National Forest
Mountains of Yosemite National Park